Siow Lee Chin (Traditional Chinese:蕭麗君, Simplified Chinese: 萧丽君) (born 1966) is a Singaporean violinist.

Featured in the American Record Guide as "a distinguished cultural asset of international stature", and The Strad as a "trailblazing role model for string players", Siow's Gold Medal victory at the 1994 Henryk Szeryng International Violin Competition launched her career as one of Singapore's first soloists on the international classical stage. Her performances been viewed on China Central TV, America's CBS, National Public Radio, and Singapore's MediaCorp.

As soloist, Siow has collaborated with orchestras such as the Royal Philharmonic Orchestra, Ludwigsburg Festival Orchestra, Houston Symphony, Dallas Symphony, the Malaysian Philharmonic Orchestra, National Philharmonic of Ukraine, National Symphony Orchestra of Chile, Mexico State Symphony Orchestra, Avignon Symphony Orchestra, Auckland Philharmonia; as well as at major concert halls and festivals in Asia, Europe and the Americas including the Royal Albert Hall, Osaka Symphony Hall, Carnegie Weill Recital Hall, Alice Tully Hall at Lincoln Center, Beijing Concert Hall, City Hall in Hong Kong, Esplanade Concert Hall, Hangzhou Grand Theatre, KonzertHaus Vienna, Petronas Concert Hall, Shanghai Oriental Arts Centre, Suzhou Arts and Cultural Center, Tchaikovsky Hall; the Aspen Music Festival, Banff Music Festival, Cervantino Music Festival, Kansai International Performing Arts Festival, Lucerne International Music Festival, Ludwigsburg International Music Festival, Music Fest Perugia and Singapore Arts Festival. She performed centerstage at the 2015 Southeast Asian Games Opening Ceremony in the 55,000 capacity National Stadium, Singapore.

Beginning her violin studies with her late father Siow Hee Shun, Siow Lee Chin traces her musical lineage all the way back to Eugène Ysaÿe, Henri Vieuxtemps and Henryk Wieniawski through their disciples and her teachers at Curtis Institute of Music, Oberlin College and Mannes: Aaron Rosand, Jascha Brodsky, Felix Galimir, Roland and Almita Vamos. Today, she continues their pedagogical tradition in her work with young people in music institutions including Beijing's Central Conservatory of Music, Seoul National University, Chicago Institute of Music, Lisbon Academy of Music, the Singapore National Youth Orchestra and as violin professor at the College of Charleston. She personalises familiar favourites with Asian motifs and introduces the music of Asian composers to the West. At the 2015 City of London Festival, she performed the world premiere of "Air", a piece written for her by Chinese composer Yao Chen, in a recital program which showcased the evolution of violin virtuosity from J.S. Bach to the present.

Siow's CD Songs My Father Taught Me was a HMV classical bestseller in 2009 and was picked for Fanfare Magazine's Want List. In 2015, Singapore Press Holdings published her memoirs From Clementi to Carnegie – The Journey of Singaporean Violinist Siow Lee Chin.

Awards and career highlights
Recipient of the Meritorious Award presented by the Composers and Authors Society of Singapore (COMPASS) for outstanding achievements and contributions to the development of music in Singapore, 2015
Awarded Fellowship in Music Performance in recognition of artistic excellence, South Carolina Arts Commission, 2012
Faculty of the Year Award (School of the Arts), College of Charleston, 2010
Soloist in concert to celebrate 20th anniversary of China Singapore diplomatic relations, 2010
Co-founded Charleston Music Fest, 2006
Soloist with Singapore Symphony Orchestra's debut tour of Japan, 2003
First recipient of the 1750 J.B.Guadagnini under the National Arts Council's Violin Loan Scheme, 2000
Singled out by the Prime Minister of Singapore as one of the most inspiring Singaporeans who has made her mark in the arts world, 1999
Royal Albert Hall debut with the Royal Philharmonic Orchestra, London, 1997
Winner of the Young Artist Award presented by the Singapore National Arts Council, 1996
Second Prize Winner, Ima Hogg Houston Symphony Competition, Texas, USA, 1995
Gold Medal Winner, Henryk Szeryng International Competition, Mexico, 1994
Gold Medal Winner, Louise D. McMahon International Music Competition, Oklahoma, USA, 1994
Winner of the Singapore Youth Award for Excellence in the Arts presented by the Prime Minister of Singapore, 1994
Winner of the 18th annual Young Artists Violin Award, Artists International Competition, New York, USA, 1990

Selected appearances - Soloist with orchestras 
Avignon Symphony Orchestra France
Auckland Philharmonia New Zealand
Bangor Symphony Orchestra USA
Bellevue Philharmonic Orchestra USA
Billings Symphony Orchestra USA
Boise Symphony Orchestra USA
Charleston Symphony Orchestra USA
Champaign-Urbana Symphony Orchestra USA
China Radio-Film Symphony Orchestra China
Curtis Symphony Orchestra USA
Dallas Symphony Orchestra USA
Erfurt Philharmonic Orchestra Germany
Enid Symphony Orchestra USA
Houston Symphony Orchestra USA
Jena Philharmonic Orchestra Germany
Jupiter Symphony Orchestra USA
Lawton Philharmonic Orchestra USA
Lviv Philharmonic Orchestra Ukraine
Lisbon Metropolitan Orchestra Portugal
Ludwisburger Festival Orchestra Germany
Malaysian Philharmonic Orchestra Singapore
National Philharmonic of Ukraine Ukraine
Northwest Florida Orchestra USA
Oberlin Orchestra USA, China (Beijing, Shanghai, Hangzhou, Wuhan, Chonqing), Singapore
Ohio Chamber Orchestra USA
Orquesta Sinfonica de Chile Chile
Rockford Symphony Orchestra USA
Royal Philharmonic Orchestra  UK & Malaysia
Singapore Symphony Orchestra Singapore & Japan
South Carolina Philharmonic USA
State Symphony Orchestra of Mexico Mexico
Syracuse Symphony Orchestra USA
Vienna United Philharmonic Austria
Virtuosi Symphony Orchestra Brazil
Wichita Falls Symphony USA 
Wuhan Philharmonic Orchestra China

Selected Masterclasses Conducted
Oberlin Conservatory of Music
Beijing Conservatory of Music
Seoul National University
Wuhan Conservatory of Music
Taiwan National Chiau Tung University Institute of Music 
Chicago Institute of Music
Lisbon Academy of Music
Ohio University
University of Maryland
University of Chile
University of Guanajuto, Mexico
University of Nevada, Las Vegas
Kiev State Music Academy, Ukraine
Lviv State Music Academy and School for Gifted Children, Ukraine
National University of Singapore, Yong Siew Toh Conservatory
Singapore National Youth Orchestra
Raffles Institution
Ball State University
University of Milwaukee
University of North Florida
Lawrence University, Appleton
University of Montana
Levine School of Music, Washington D.C.
Governor's School for the Arts and Humanities, South Carolina
Youth Orchestra of the Lowcountry, South Carolina
Fine Arts Institute, South Carolina
Weathersfield Music Festival
Chamber Music Festival of Milwaukee
VIRTUOSI Festival, Brazil
Music Fest Perugia, Italy

References

External links
 
 

Singaporean classical violinists
Living people
1966 births
21st-century classical violinists
Women classical violinists